Ashok Menaria (born 29 October 1990) is an Indian cricketer. He is a left-handed batsman and slow left arm orthodox bowler who plays for Rajasthan. He played for the Rajasthan Royals from 2011 to 2013.

Menaria began his competitive cricketing career playing for Rajasthan Under-15s, in their winless 2005-06 Polly Umrigar Trophy run.  The following season he represented the Under-17s team, and, in a game against Karnataka Under-17s, scored the second-highest innings total in the 2006-07 Vijay Merchant Trophy - starring alongside Ankit Lamba in an unbeaten partnership of 397 - himself contributing 227 of these runs.

Following four appearances in Rajasthan Under-19s' 2008-09 Vinoo Mankad Trophy campaign, Menaria made his first-class debut against Mumbai in November 2008. He appeared in 79 first-class matches for Rajasthan and scored 4677 runs. His best score is 230. Menaria also took 20 wickets in first class cricket.

From 2011 to 2013, Ashok Menaria was a member of the Rajasthan Royals in the Indian Premier League.

Menaria captained India's 15-man squad for the 2010 Under-19 Cricket World Cup. In the World Cup, unfortunately, he did not perform at all. In five innings, he only scored 31 runs and got six wickets.

He was the leading run-scorer for Khelaghar Samaj Kallyan Samity in the 2017–18 Dhaka Premier Division Cricket League, with 662 runs in 15 matches.

References

External links

1990 births
Living people
Indian cricketers
Rajasthan cricketers
Rajasthan Royals cricketers
Central Zone cricketers
India Red cricketers
Cricketers from Jaipur
Prime Doleshwar Sporting Club cricketers
Khelaghar Samaj Kallyan Samity cricketers